Kristian Præstbro (born 11 December 1954) is a former international speedway rider from Denmark.

Speedway career 
Præstbro won a gold medal at the Speedway World Team Cup in the 1978 Speedway World Team Cup. Although unused he received the medal as one of the five riders named in the team and was at the event ready to ride as a replacement in any heat called upon. He rode in the top tier of British Speedway from 1976 to 1979, riding for Cradley Heath Heathens and Belle Vue Aces.

World final appearances

World Team Cup
 1978 -  Landshut, Stadion Ellermühle (with Ole Olsen / Hans Nielsen / Finn Thomsen / Mike Lohmann) - Winner - 37pts (stood as reserve)

World Longtrack Championship
 1975 –  Gornja Radgona 17th 1pt
 1977 –  Aalborg 7th 12pts
 1978 –  Mühldorf 12th 9pts 
 1979 –  Mariánské Lázně 8th 11pts

References 

1954 births
Danish speedway riders
Belle Vue Aces riders
Cradley Heathens riders
Living people
People from Esbjerg
Sportspeople from the Region of Southern Denmark